Ametrine, also known as trystine or by its trade name as bolivianite, is a naturally occurring variety of quartz. It is a mixture of amethyst and citrine with zones of purple and yellow or orange.  Almost all commercially available ametrine is mined in Bolivia. 

The colour of the zones visible within ametrine are due to differing oxidation states of iron within the crystal. The citrine segments have oxidized iron while the amethyst segments are unoxidized. The different oxidation states occur due to there being a temperature gradient across the crystal during its formation. Artificial ametrine is grown with the hydrothermal method using solutions doped with specific elements, followed by irradiation of the created crystals.

Ametrine in the low price segment may stem from synthetic material. Green-yellow or golden-blue ametrine does not exist naturally.

Structure 

Ametrine is composed of silicon dioxide (SiO2) and it is a tectosilicate, which means it has a silicate framework linked together through shared oxygen atoms.

History 
Legend has it that ametrine was first introduced to Europe by a conquistador's gifts to the Spanish Queen in the 1600s, after he received a mine in Bolivia as a dowry when he married a princess from the native Ayoreos tribe.

See also
 List of minerals

References

External links

Ametrine at the International Colored Gemstone Association
Ametrine: Mineral Information Page
Ametrine: Ametrine mineral information and data
Insider Gemologist: What Are the Identifying Characteristics of Citrine, Ametrine, Smoky Quartz, and Scapolite? 

Quartz gemstones